= IFNR =

Genetic element in the species Homo sapiens

Identifiers
- Aliases: IFNR, IFNGM, IFNGM2, interferon production regulator
- External IDs: OMIM: 147573; GeneCards: IFNR; OMA:IFNR - orthologs
Orthologs
Species	Human	Mouse
Entrez	3466	n/a
Ensembl	n/a	n/a
UniProt	n a	n/a
RefSeq (mRNA)	n/a	n/a
RefSeq (protein)	n/a	n/a
Location (UCSC)	n/a	n/a
PubMed search		n/a
- Wikidata
View/Edit Human

Interferon production regulator is a protein that in humans is encoded by the IFNR gene.
